Andreyevskaya is a rural locality (a village) in Beketovskoye Rural Settlement, Vozhegodsky District, Vologda Oblast, Russia. The population was 28 as of 2002.

Geography 
Andreyevskaya is located 76 km southwest of Vozhega (the district's administrative centre) by road. Voskresenskoye is the nearest rural locality.

References 

Rural localities in Vozhegodsky District